"Try Me", titled "Try Me (I Need You)" in its original release, is a song recorded by James Brown and The Famous Flames in 1958. It was a #1 R&B hit and charted #48 Pop - the group's first appearance on the Billboard Hot 100. It was Brown and the Flames' second charting single, ending a two-year dry spell after the success of "Please, Please, Please".

Background
By 1958 James Brown's career was faltering. After disputes over royalties, songwriting credit, and the indignity of having been relegated to backup singers on the billing of "Please, Please, Please", most of the original Famous Flames (including founder Bobby Byrd) had walked out on him; only Johnny Terry remained. Brown continued to perform with a backing band and a new Flames lineup consisting of members of Little Richard's former vocal group,  the Dominions. ("Big Bill" Hollings, Louis Madison, and J.W. Archer). They recorded more songs for Federal Records, but nine of their singles in a row failed to chart.

On the way back to Macon, Georgia after a disappointing West Coast tour, Brown approached his guitar player Bobby Roach with a tune he said he had been given by a patron at the Million Dollar Palms, a Florida nightclub. After Roach crafted a guitar part for "Try Me", Brown and the Flames worked out the vocal harmonies together and cut a demo to send to label head Syd Nathan. Nathan was impressed with it and arranged for a recording session in New York with producer Andy Gibson and a group of seasoned session musicians. Despite the contributions of other people, Brown took the sole writing credit for the song.

In his 1986 autobiography, Brown described "Try Me" as "really a pop tune. I had heard "Raindrops" by Dee Clark and "For Your Precious Love" by Jerry Butler and the Impressions, so I wrote my song to fit between them." However, "Raindrops" was actually released more than two years after "Try Me".

Reception
Released in October 1958, the song became their first to crack the R&B charts in three years and their first ever to crack the Billboard Hot 100 after their relative failure of "Please, Please, Please" peaking at number 5 on Billboard's Bubbling Under chart (or #105). The song peaked at number one on the R&B chart in February of 1959 and reached number 48 on the Hot 100. The song sold over a million copies and saved the Famous Flames from having their contract dropped due to lack of hits following the original Famous Flames disbanding and Brown's struggles to deal with the group and their performances on the chitlin' circuit. The song was also the best-selling R&B single of 1958, and its success gave Brown confidence in his own abilities as a musician and gave him the needs to build his career.

"Try Me" was included on the albums Please Please Please (King, 1958) and Try Me! (King, 1959).

Personnel
 James Brown - lead vocal

The Famous Flames
 Johnny Terry - background vocals
 Bill Hollings - background vocals
 J.W. Archer -  background vocals
 Louis Madison - background vocals

Musicians
 George Dorsey - alto saxophone
 Clifford Scott - tenor saxophone
 Ernie Hayes - piano 
 Kenny Burrell - guitar
 Carl Pruitt - bass
 David "Panama" Francis - drums

Other versions

Brown recorded an instrumental version of "Try Me" for the Smash label in 1965 which charted #34 R&B and #63 Pop in the U.S. 

Performances of "Try Me" appear on Live at the Apollo and most of Brown's subsequent live albums. Brown & The Flames recorded a version of "Try Me" with strings for his 1963 album Prisoner of Love.

Bone Thugs-N-Harmony member Bizzy Bone sampled this song in his track, "I Need You," released on his album, "A Song For You."

References

External links
 [ Song Review] from Allmusic

James Brown songs
The Famous Flames songs
1958 singles
Songs written by James Brown
1958 songs
Federal Records singles